Rohit Talwar (16 September 1965 – 14 December 2014) was an Indian cricketer. He played 26 first-class matches for Madhya Pradesh between 1982 and 1990.

See also
 List of Madhya Pradesh cricketers

References

External links
 

1965 births
2014 deaths
Indian cricketers
Madhya Pradesh cricketers
Sportspeople from Kanpur